National Seed Corporation is a Government of India undertaking (Miniratna) for development of seed industry in India. It produces 1.5 lakh tons of seed per year with net worth 633.62 Crores. Founded in March 1963, its headquarters is in New Delhi.

References 

Government-owned companies of India
1963 establishments in Delhi
Organisations based in Delhi